Ciro Quispe López is the Bishop-Prelate of Territorial Prelature of Juli (Peru)

Early life and education 
Ciro was born in Cuzco, Peru on 20 October 1973. He studied from San Antonio Abad, seminary. He studied from Regina Apostolorum Athenaeum and at the Angelicum University. He also holds a licentiate in biblical theology and doctorate in biblical sciences from the Pontifical Gregorian University in Rome.

Priesthood 
On 30 November 2001 Ciro received his priestly ordination. He was incardinated in the archdiocese of Cuzco. He was serving as director of studies in the San Antonio Abad, Major Seminary in Cuzco.

Episcopate 
On 15 November 2018, Pope Francis appointed Ciro as Prelate of Juli, Peru. His episcopal ordination was on 15 Dec 2018 at San Pedro Apostol Cathedral, Juli, Peru. The principal consecrator was Nicola Girasoli and principal co-consecrators were Archbishop Héctor Miguel Cabrejos Vidarte and Archbishop Richard Daniel Alarcón Urrutia.

References 

1973 births
Living people
People from Cusco
Bishops appointed by Pope Francis
21st-century Roman Catholic bishops in Peru
Pontifical Gregorian University alumni
Roman Catholic bishops of Juli